Jack or John Marin may refer to:

 Jack Marin (musician), American musician 
 Jack Marin, John Marin, American basketball player
 John Marin, artist